Peringamala  is a grama  panchayat in Thiruvananthapuram district in the state of Kerala, India.  There are two places named Peringammala, the other one is between Balaramapuram and Venganoor which is on the southern side of the Thiruvananthapuram district.There is two villages Peringammala and Thennoor.

History
The verdant village of Peringammala is located in the valley of the Ponmudi hills. It owes its name to the Tamil/Malayalam word, Periyamala  meaning The Big Mountain. In the olden days this area was reputed for various forest produce like honey.

Geography
Peringammala panchayath (an administrative unit) consists of two villages namely Peringammala and Thennoor. Peringammala is the largest panchayth in Thiruvananthapuram district and is the second largest in the state of Kerala. Peringammala shares its east boundary with Tamil Nadu.

Demographics 
 India census, Peringamala had a population of 21477 with 10361 males and 11116 females. The majority are tribal people and agriculture is the main occupation.

1. Name of Grama Panchayath : Peringammala 
2. Village : Peringammala, Thennoor
3. Block Panchayath : Vamanapuram 
4. Thalook : Nedumangadu 
5. Legislative Mandalam : Vamanapuram 
6. Parliament Mandalam : Attingal 
7. District : Thiruvananthapuram 
8. Breadth : 217.94km2 
9. Boundaries 
10. East : Ambasamudram(Tamil Nadu)
11. South : Vamanapuram River 
12. West : T.S. Road
13. North : Ammayamblam Pacha
(Kulathupuzha Reserve Forest)
14. Population : 39792 
15. Female : 20688 
16. Male : 19104 
17. Tribal people population

18. Scheduled cast Sect : 6147

19. Male : 3041 
20. Female : 3105 
21. Scheduled Tribe Sect : 3289 
22. Male : 1588 
23. Female : 1701 
24. Block Panchayath Divisions : 2, (Idinjar, Palode)
25. District Panchayath Division : 1, (Palode)

References 

Villages in Thiruvananthapuram district